The 1971 Siquijor creation plebiscite was a plebiscite on the separation of the sub-province of Siquijor from the province of Negros Oriental in order to become its own province as stipulated in Republic Act No. 6398 that was passed on September 17, 1971. A plebiscite on selecting the capital of the new province was also held simultaneously.

The plebiscite was held on November 8, 1971, and the results were announced on February 22, 1972.

Results

Creation of Siquijor province

Summary

By municipality

Siquijor's capital

Summary

By municipality

References 

1971 referendums
1971 in the Philippines
Provincial plebiscites in the Philippines
Administrative division referendums
Multiple-choice referendums